Stauropus is a genus of moths of the family Notodontidae first described by Ernst Friedrich Germar in 1812.

Species
Subgenus Benbowia Kiriakoff, 1967
Stauropus callista (Schintlmeister, 1997)
Stauropus camilla (Schintlmeister, 1997)
Stauropus kiriakoff (Holloway, 1983)
Stauropus takamukuanus (Matsumura, 1925)
Stauropus virescens (Moore, 1879)
Subgenus Chlorostauropus Kiriakoff, 1968
Stauropus alternus Walker, 1855
Stauropus viridissimus Bethune-Baker, 1904
Subgenus Miostauropus Kiriakoff, 1964
Stauropus mioides (Hampson, 1904)
Subgenus Palaeostauropus Okagaki & Nakamura, 1953
Stauropus obliterata Wileman & South, 1917
Subgenus Stauropus
Stauropus abitus Kobayashi, M. Wang & Kishida, 2007
Stauropus basalis Moore, 1877
Stauropus berberisae Moore 1888
Stauropus fagi (Linnaeus, 1758)
Stauropus major van Eecke, 1929
Stauropus picteti Oberthür, 1911
Stauropus sikkimensis Moore, 1865
Stauropus skoui Schintlmeister, 2008
Stauropus teikichiana Matsumura, 1929
Stauropus teikichiana boreas Kobayashi & Kishida, 2007
Stauropus teikichiana fuscus Kobayashi & M. Wang, 2007
Stauropus teikichiana notus Kobayashi & Kishida, 2007
Subgenus unknown
Stauropus basinigra (Moore, [1866])

References

Notodontidae